The 2019 season was PDRM's 3rd season in the Malaysia Premier League since being relegated from the Malaysia Super League in 2016.

Malaysia Premier League

Matches
The Malaysian Football League (MFL) announced the fixtures for the 2019 season on 22 December 2018.

League table

Malaysia FA Cup

Malaysia Cup

Group stage

Squad statistics

Appearances and goals

|-

|-

|-

|-

|-

|-

|-

|-

|-

|-

|-

|-

|-

|-

|-

|-

|-

|-

|-

|-

|-

|- 

|- 

|- 

|- 

|- 
|colspan="14"|Players who appeared for PDRM no longer at the club:
|-

|-

|-

|-

|-

|-

|-
|}

Transfers

In
1st leg

2nd leg

Out
1st leg

2nd leg

References

2019
Malaysian football clubs 2019 season